Hunters & Collectors is the self-titled debut studio album by Australian rock band, Hunters & Collectors, which was released on 26 July 1982. It was produced by the band with Tony Cohen as audio engineer. The album peaked at No. 21 on the Australian Kent Music Report Albums Chart and No. 14 on the New Zealand Albums Chart. The album's first single, "Talking to a Stranger", was released ahead of the album on 12 July, and was accompanied by a music video directed by film maker Richard Lowenstein, but it did not reach the Top 50 on the related singles chart.

Background 
Hunters & Collectors was recorded by Australian rock band, Hunters & Collectors from October 1981 to the following April. The group had formed earlier in 1981 with the line up of former members of Jetsonnes: John Archer on electric bass; Doug Falconer on drums; Robert Miles as live sound and art director; Mark Seymour on guitar and lead vocals; and Ray Tosti-Guerra on guitar and vocals; joined by Geoff Crosby on keyboards; and Greg Perano on percussion (ex-True Wheels). They were expanded by a horn section, later dubbed Horns of Contempt, comprising Nigel Crocker and Michael Waters, both on trombone; Jack Howard, Andy Lynn and Chris Malherbe, each on trumpet; and Jeremy Smith on French horn.

Mushroom Records specifically formed a new alternative label, White Label Records, when they signed Hunters & Collectors. Their first release was World of Stone, a three-track extended play in January 1982. Hunters & Collectors, followed on 26 July 1982 and was produced by the group with Sydney-based engineer Tony Cohen recording at AAV Studios, Melbourne. The album peaked at No. 21 on the Australian Kent Music Report Albums Chart. Their first single from the album, "Talking to a Stranger" was released ahead of the album on 12 July, and was accompanied by a music video directed by film maker Richard Lowenstein, but it did not reach the Top 50 singles chart.

By this time, Tosti-Guerra was replaced by Martin Lubran on guitar and the Horns of Contempt were reduced to three, Howard, Smith and Waters. In July this line up contributed four new tracks for the United States version of Hunters & Collectors, which retained three tracks from the Australian version. The co-producer for the new tracks was Mike Howlett, which were released in Australia as the group's second extended play, Payload, on 6 December 1982. Howlett had also remixed "Talking to a Stranger" for the US version of the album.

In early 1983, the band began a six-month tour of the United Kingdom and signed to Virgin Records, who combined their album, Hunters & Collectors and the Payload EP into a UK LP re-release of Hunters & Collectors. The US version of the album was released on the Oz Records label, the US imprint of Mushroom Records and was distributed by A&M Records. In July 1991 the album was re-issued on compact disc, which included all three tracks from World of Stone. In August 2003 the latter version was re-released by Liberation Blue.

Reception 

Some years later, Allmusic's Bill Cassel found Hunters & Collectors (US version) to be "seething art funk comparable to a harder-edged Shriekback or less political Gang of Four"; at the time of its launch, Shriekback had only released one EP. Their lyrics "are stream-of-consciousness poetics that range from the merely incomprehensible to the downright silly". Seymour's vocal delivery "does not sound entirely comfortable" while the "muscular rhythms" of Archer and Falconer "motor right over the young band's shortcomings".

Australian musicologist, Ian McFarlane, felt that the album provided "one of the band's early classics" with the lead single, "Talking to a Stranger", and lauded its "radical film clip" by Lowenstein. The track was "an expression of alienation and sheer anguish". While fellow music journalist, Ed Nimmervoll, opined "[its] theme of alienation and anguish is one the band would return to, but for the moment the group's emphasis was the free-form side of their work".

Track listing 

The original release (White Label L-42002) was as an LP plus a 12" single.

All tracks are written by John Archer, Geoff Crosby, Doug Falconer, Robert Miles, Greg Perano, Mark Seymour, Ray Tosti-Guerra (unless otherwise noted).

Personnel 
Credited to:

Hunters & Collectors members
 John Archer – electric bass
 Geoff Crosby – keyboards
 Doug Falconer – drums
 Robert Miles – live sound, art director
 Greg Perano – percussion
 Mark Seymour – guitar, lead vocals
 Ray Tosti-Guerra – guitar, vocals

Horns of Contempt members
 Nigel Crocker – trombone
 Jack Howard – trumpet
 Andy Lynn – trumpet
 Chris Malherbe – trumpet
 Jeremy Smith – French horn
 Michael Waters – trombone

Production details
 Producer – Hunters & Collectors
 Engineer – Tony Cohen (except "Boo Boo Kiss"), Jim Barton (track "Boo Boo Kiss")
 Mixer – Robert Miles, Jim Barton
 Studios – AAV Studios, Melbourne

Charts

Release history

References 

Hunters & Collectors albums
1982 albums
Mushroom Records albums